Sander is a power tool used for smoothing wood.

Sander may also refer to:

People
 Sander (name), a list of people with the name Sander
 Sander (footballer) (born 1990), a Brazilian footballer

Places
 Sander, Norway, a small village in the municipality of Sør-Odal in Innlandet county, Norway
 Sander (crater), a crater on Mercury

Other
 Sander (fish), a genus of fish that includes the walleye and zander
 sander, a computer program in the AMBER#Programs molecular dynamics simulation package.
 Sandbox (locomotive) on a locomotive to provide improved traction.
 A sander to spread sand on icy roads in winter.

See also
Chander
Kander (disambiguation)
Sandar (disambiguation)
Sanders (disambiguation)
Xander (disambiguation)
Zander (disambiguation)